Nitrogen-15 nuclear magnetic resonance spectroscopy (nitrogen-15 NMR spectroscopy, or just simply 15N NMR) is a version of nuclear magnetic resonance spectroscopy that examines samples containing the 15N nucleus. 15N NMR differs in several ways from the more common 13C and 1H NMR. To circumvent the difficulties associated with measurement of the quadrupolar, spin-1 14N nuclide, 15N NMR is employed in samples for detection since it has a ground-state spin of ½.  Since14N is 99.64% abundant, incorporation of 15N into samples often requires novel synthetic techniques.

Nitrogen-15 is frequently used in nuclear magnetic resonance spectroscopy (NMR), because unlike the more abundant nitrogen-14, that has an integer nuclear spin and thus a quadrupole moment, 15N has a fractional nuclear spin of one-half, which offers advantages for NMR like narrower line width. Proteins can be isotopically labeled by cultivating them in a medium containing nitrogen-15 as the only source of nitrogen. In addition, nitrogen-15 is used to label proteins in quantitative proteomics (e.g. SILAC).

Implementation
15N NMR has complications not encountered in 1H and 13C NMR spectroscopy. The 0.36% natural abundance of 15N results in a major sensitivity penalty.  Sensitivity is made worse by its low gyromagnetic ratio (γ = −27.126 × 106 T−1s−1), which is 10.14% that of 1H.  The signal-to-noise ratio for 1H is about 300-fold greater than 15N at the same magnetic field strength.

Physical properties

The physical properties of 15N are quite different from other nuclei. Its properties along with several common nuclei are summarized in the below table.

Chemical shift trends

The International Union of Pure and Applied Chemistry (IUPAC) recommends using CH3NO2 as the experimental standard; however in practice many spectroscopists utilize pressurized NH3(l) instead. For 15N, chemical shifts referenced with NH3(l) are 380.5 ppm upfield from CH3NO2 (δNH3 = δCH3NO2 + 380.5 ppm). Chemical shifts for 15N are somewhat erratic but typically they span a range of -400 ppm to 1100 ppm with respect to CH3NO2. Below is a summary of 15N chemical shifts for common organic groups referenced with respect to NH3, whose chemical shift is assigned 0 ppm.

Gyromagnetic ratio

Unlike most nuclei, the gyromagnetic ratio for 15N is negative.  With the spin precession phenomenon, the sign of γ determines the sense (clockwise vs counterclockwise) of precession.  Most common nuclei have positive gyromagnetic ratios such as 1H and 13C.

Applications

Tautomerization

15N NMR is used in a wide array of areas from biological to inorganic techniques. A famous application in organic synthesis is to utilize 15N to monitor tautomerization equilibria in heteroaromatics because of the dramatic change in 15N shifts between tautomers.

Protein NMR

15N NMR is also extremely valuable in protein NMR investigations. Most notably, the introduction of three-dimensional experiments with 15N lifts the ambiguity in 13C–13C two-dimensional experiments. In solid-state nuclear magnetic resonance (ssNMR), for example, 15N is most commonly utilized in NCACX, NCOCX, and CANcoCX pulse sequences.

Investigation of nitrogen-containing heterocycles 
15N NMR is the most effective method for investigation of structure of heterocycles with a high content of nitrogen atoms (tetrazoles, triazines and their annelated analogs). 15N labeling followed by analysis of 13C–15N and 1H–15N couplings may be used for establishing structures and chemical transformations of nitrogen heterocycles.

INEPT

Insensitive nuclei enhanced by polarization transfer (INEPT) is a signal resolution enhancement method. Because 15N has a gyromagnetic ratio that is small in magnitude, the resolution is quite poor. A common pulse sequence which dramatically improves the resolution for 15N is INEPT. The INEPT is an elegant solution in most cases because it increases the Boltzmann polarization and lowers T1 values (thus scans are shorter). Additionally, INEPT can accommodate negative gyromagnetic ratios, whereas the common nuclear Overhauser effect (NOE) cannot.

See also
Heteronuclear single quantum coherence spectroscopy (HSQC)
Two-dimensional nuclear magnetic resonance spectroscopy
Triple-resonance nuclear magnetic resonance spectroscopy

References

Nuclear magnetic resonance